Aincille is a commune in the Pyrénées-Atlantiques department in the Nouvelle-Aquitaine region in southwestern France.

The inhabitants of the commune are known as Aintzildars.

Geography

Location
The town is part of Cize Country in the former Basque province of Lower Navarre.

It is located some 50 km south-east of Bayonne and 5 km southeast of Saint-Jean-Pied-de-Port.

Access
The commune can be accessed by the D401 road from Saint-Jean-Pied-de-Port in the northwest to the village. From the village the D118 road goes north to join the D18 highway.

Hydrography
Located in the drainage basin of the Adour, the northeastern border of the commune is marked by the Laurhibar river, which flows north to join the Nive north of Saint-Jean-Pied-de-Port. A stream rises near the village and flows to the Laurhibar in the north-east. The Urtchipea rises in the south of the commune and flows northwest gathering many tributaries and joins the Nive de Beherobie at Saint-Michel. The Sassitako erreka rises southwest of the village and flows northwest joining the Laurhibar east of Saint-Jean-Pied-de-Port.

Localities and hamlets

 Ahadoa
 Aïntzilsarria
 Bassaburua
 Bentaberria
 Berho
 Chiramberroa
 Esconda
 Etcheverrigaraya
 Gamaberria
 Goyhenetchéa
 Handiague
 Harchilo
 Jaureguia
 Oilloquy
 Pagola
 Sahaby
 Sotalda

Toponymy
The commune name in basque is Aintzila meaning "hill of mud", Aintzila or Aintzil-Harrieta.

Jean-Baptiste Orpustan wrote the name of the commune in the form Aïncille. He also indicated that in Basque the inhabitants are referred to as Aintzildar.

The following table details the origins of the commune name.

Sources:
Mérimée: Presentation of the Commune of Aincille on the Ministry of Culture website
Orpustan: Jean-Baptiste Orpustan,   New Basque Toponymy
Raymond: Topographic Dictionary of the Department of Basses-Pyrenees, 1863, on the page numbers indicated in the table. 
Cassini: 

Origins:
Intendance: Intendance of Pau

History
Part of Aincille territory next to the communes of Ahaxe-Alciette-Bascassan, Bustince-Iriberry, Çaro, Lecumberry, Mendive, Saint-Jean-le-Vieux, and Saint-Michel, was taken on 11 June 1842 to form of the commune of Estérençuby.

Heraldry

Administration

List of Successive Mayors of Aincille

Inter-communality
The commune belongs to six intercommunal structures:
the Communauté d'agglomération du Pays Basque
the AEP association of Ainhice
the energy association for Pyrenees-Atlantiques
the intercommunal association for the development and management of the slaughterhouse at Saint-Jean-Pied-de-Port
the joint association for the watershed of the Nive
the association to support Basque culture.

Population

Economy
The town is part of the production area of Irouléguy AOC and the Appellation d'origine contrôlée (AOC) zone of Ossau-iraty.

Economic activity is mainly agricultural.
 
Aincille had long received saline (saline of Ugarré) since the 17th century and had the distinction of being a corporation with ownership of twenty-nine old houses of the town and was reunited with the royal domain in 1683.

Culture and heritage

Languages
According to the Map of the Seven Basque Provinces published in 1863 by Prince Louis-Lucien Bonaparte, the dialect of Basque spoken in Aincille is Eastern Low Navarrese.

Civil heritage

The commune has several sites that are registered as historical monuments:
Houses and Farms (18th-19th century)
The Idiondoa Farmhouse (1617)
The Ahadoberria Farmhouse (1768)

Religious Heritage

The commune has several religious sites that are registered as historical monuments:
The Croix de Carrefour (Crossroads Cross) Wayside Cross
A Cemetery Cross (17th century)
The Parish Church of the Assumption of the Blessed Virgin Mary and Saint John the Baptist (Middle Ages) The church contains two items that are registered as historical objects:
A Processional Cross (18th century)
A Statue: Virgin and child (13th century)

Church Picture Gallery

Stained Glass

See also
Communes of the Pyrénées-Atlantiques department

References

External links
Aincille on the 1750 Cassini Map

Communes of Pyrénées-Atlantiques
Lower Navarre